James Hill was an English footballer.

Career
Hill most likely joined Port Vale in the summer of 1917. He scored on his debut at outside-left in a 4–1 defeat at local rivals Stoke on 6 October 1917. He was a regular in the first team from the following month, though was on active duty from March 1918 to January 1919 and so was unable to play any matches. He was rarely picked during the 1919–20 Second Division season however, but was in the starting 11 for the Staffordshire Senior Cup win of 1920. He was released at the end of the 1920–21 campaign and so moved on to Shrewsbury Town.

Career statistics
Source:

Honours
Port Vale
Staffordshire Senior Cup: 1920

References

Sportspeople from Hanley, Staffordshire
English footballers
Association football midfielders
Port Vale F.C. players
British Army personnel of World War I
Shrewsbury Town F.C. players
English Football League players
Year of birth missing
Year of death missing